Centerville is an unincorporated community in Faulkner County, Arkansas, United States.

References

Unincorporated communities in Faulkner County, Arkansas
Unincorporated communities in Arkansas